Sutham Aswanit (born 23 March 1932) is a Thai former sports shooter. He competed at the 1968, 1972 and 1976 Summer Olympics. He also competed at the 1970 and 1974 Asian Games.

References

External links
 

1932 births
Living people
Sutham Aswanit
Sutham Aswanit
Shooters at the 1968 Summer Olympics
Shooters at the 1972 Summer Olympics
Shooters at the 1976 Summer Olympics
Place of birth missing (living people)
Asian Games medalists in shooting
Shooters at the 1970 Asian Games
Shooters at the 1974 Asian Games
Sutham Aswanit
Sutham Aswanit
Medalists at the 1970 Asian Games
Medalists at the 1974 Asian Games
Sutham Aswanit